True's vole (Hyperacrius fertilis) is a species of rodent in the family Cricetidae.
It is found in India and Pakistan.

References

Musser, G. G. and M. D. Carleton. 2005. Superfamily Muroidea. pp. 894–1531 in Mammal Species of the World a Taxonomic and Geographic Reference. D. E. Wilson and D. M. Reeder eds. Johns Hopkins University Press, Baltimore.

Hyperacrius
Rodents of Pakistan
Rodents of India
Mammals described in 1894
Taxonomy articles created by Polbot
Taxa named by Frederick W. True